Wang Yan or Wangyan may refer to:

People
Wang Yan (Jin dynasty) (256–311), politician and pure talk leader of the Jin dynasty (266–420) 
Wang Zongyan (899–926), known as Wang Yan after 918, emperor of Former Shu 
Wang Yan (entrepreneur) (born 1972), Chinese entrepreneur and co-founder of Sina Corp
Wang Yan (actress) (born 1974), Chinese actress
Wang Yan (activist) (born 1986), Chinese animal welfare activist

Sportspeople
Wang Yan (racewalker) (born 1971), Chinese race walker
Wang Yan (cyclist) (born 1974), Chinese cyclist
Wang Yan (skier) (born 1974), Chinese cross-country skier
Wang Yan (footballer) (born 1991), Chinese footballer
Wang Yan (tennis) (born 1996), Chinese tennis player
Wang Yan (gymnast) (born 1999), Chinese gymnast
Wang Yan (judoka) (born 1994), Chinese judoka

Places in China
Wangyan, Anhui (王堰), a town Funan County, Anhui
Wangyan, Shaanxi (王阎), a town in Shanyang County, Shaanxi

See also
Yan Wang (disambiguation)
Wang Yang (disambiguation)